

Interact with our program: https://www.esmap.org/node/70853
ESMAP was established in 1983 in response to the global energy crisis of the late 1970s, and the impact this was having on the economies of oil-importing developing countries. ESMAP has since operated in over 100 countries through more than 800 activities covering a broad range of energy issues.

Role
Achieving Universal Energy Access By 2030 And Advancing Decarbonization

Activities
Visit our Activities Dashboard: https://www.esmap.org/activities

Governance
ESMAP is governed by a Consultative Group (CG) comprising representatives from contributing donors and chaired by the Senior Director of the World Bank's Energy and Extractives Practice Group. The CG meets annually to review ESMAP's strategic direction, achievements, use of resources and funding requirements.

The World Bank's Independent Evaluation Group (IEG) also reviews and assesses the performance of all World Bank Global Trust-Funded Programs.  This includes an evaluation of ESMAP against its business plans, investment frameworks, and the effectiveness and efficiency of the deployment of trust fund resources. In addition, IEG assesses the World Bank's management and accountability for the use of trust fund resources and the impact of trust funds on the World Bank's development role. Read the most recent IEG evaluation. 

ESMAP's latest Independent External Evaluation completed in March 2020 is a requirement by the World Bank to review the performance of programs reaching the end of their business plans. On this occasion, the evaluation covers the 2017-2020 Business Plan.  A Briefing Note was also prepared aiming at synthesizing the contents of the full evaluation.  As customary, following the evaluation's recommendations, ESMAP Management prepared a response.

The previous Independent External Evaluation covered a four-year period from July 2011 to June 2015.  Two years of the previous (2008-2013) and the subsequent (2014-2016) ESMAP business plans, and one year of the previous ASTAE business plan and three years of the ASTAE business plan (2012-2016).  With both these business plans having reached their end date, the World Bank Group (WBG) required an external evaluator to review the performance of ESMAP and ASTAE against their respective business plans and investment frameworks. As a follow up to the evaluation's recommendations, the ESMAP Management Team prepared a response.

Download full list of ESMAP's Donors: https://www.esmap.org/sites/default/files/Donor%20Logos-Agencies%20by%20Country.pdf

External links
 ESMAP website
 World Bank website - energy

References 

Sustainable energy
World Bank